The 2013 International Challenge Cup was held from February 21 to 24, 2013 at the Uithof in The Hague. Skaters competed in the disciplines of men's singles, ladies' singles on the senior, novice, and pre-novice "Debs" levels, and pair skating at the senior level only.

Senior results

Men

Ladies

Pairs

Novice results

Boys

Girls

Debs results

Boys

Girls

References

External links
 2013 International Challenge Cup official site
 Starting orders and results (Senior and Novice)
 Starting orders and results (Debs)
 Official videos

International Challenge Cup
International Challenge Cup, 2013
International Challenge Cup